The 1998–99 Purdue Boilermakers women's basketball team was the first Purdue basketball team to win an NCAA national championship. The team was undefeated in conference play and finished the regular season with one loss.

Background
This season was Carolyn Peck's second and final season coaching Purdue's women's basketball team.

Schedule

Non-conference
The season started off with two wins, including a road win at the University of Arizona. They lost their third game to Stanford, their only loss of the season. The team closed out their non-conference schedule with wins against 4th ranked Louisiana Tech and 20th ranked Florida.

Conference
The team finished their conference schedule undefeated, winning sixteen games in a row. They played two ranked teams, beating them three times.

NCAA tournament
Purdue began the tournament as a number 1 seed in the Midwest region, played in Normal, Illinois. The team played Oral Roberts, winning 68–48. The team then played 9th seed Kansas. Purdue won that matchup 55–41. They moved on to play 4th seed North Carolina, winning 82–59 in the Regional semifinals. The last game in the Midwest region was played against 3rd seed Rutgers, which Purdue beat 75–62.

Purdue moved on to the Final Four, played in San Jose, California. They played Louisiana Tech, the number 1 seed from the West region. Purdue won 77–63. They faced Duke in the finals, who was coached by a former Purdue coach. Two of the Duke players also formerly played at Purdue before transferring. Carolyn Peck coached Purdue to a 62–45 win, in what was her last game before moving on to the Orlando Miracle. This was the Boilermaker's first national championship.  It was also the first ncaa national title by a women's basketball team from the Big Ten.

Source

References

Purdue
Purdue Boilermakers women's basketball seasons
Purdue
Purdue
NCAA Division I women's basketball tournament Final Four seasons
NCAA Division I women's basketball tournament championship seasons